The 1959 SANFL Grand Final was an Australian rules football competition.   beat  87 to 77 to claim its sixth consecutive premiership.

Scorecard

Six-in-a-row 
By winning the 1959 SANFL Grand Final, Port Adelaide set a senior Australian rules football record winning six consecutive Grand Finals.

References 

SANFL Grand Finals
SANFL Grand Final, 1959